Baroy, officially the Municipality of Baroy (Maranao: Inged a Baroy;), is a 4th class municipality in the province of Lanao del Norte, Philippines. According to the 2020 census, it has a population of 24,683 people.

History
As early as 1918, Baroy was originally called Baloy, a plant commonly found in the community that is used for mat weaving. Later on, the said plant became extinct and the inhabitants of the locality decided to change the name to Baroy.

The municipality of Baroy was formerly a mere barrio of the municipal district of Kolambugan. When Tubod was separated from Kolambugan (Republic Act No. 58, October 17, 1946), the barrios of Baroy, Sagadan, and Princesa were brought along with it. It became a regular municipality on June 10, 1949, by virtue of Executive Order No. 222 during the term of President Elpidio L. Quirino. The act stated that the municipality of Baroy would be separated from Tubod, and that parts of Kolambugan would be annexed to the two towns.

On January 13, 1960, the town of Salvador was separated from the town through Executive Order No. 370.

Baroy celebrates Lechon Festival every 10th day of June.

Geography
Geographically, Baroy is bordered on the north by Panguil Bay and on the east by the Municipality of Tubod, on the south by the Municipality of Salvador, on the west by the Municipality of Lala.

Baroy has a total area of approximately 8,009.2935 hectares.  The agricultural land is approximately 5,348.3994 hectares.  Coco lands accounted to about 4,921.6994 hectares and the remaining 426.70 hectares are devoted to rice production. Of said rice lands, 251.2 hectares are irrigated while 175.50 hectares are rainfed area.

Barangays
Baroy is politically subdivided into 23 barangays.

Climate

Demographics

Economy

The economy of Baroy is derived mainly from small establishments and agriculture.

1st Valley Bank, a rural bank with a number of branches in Mindanao, have their headquarters in Baroy. A branch of MLhuillier is also situated in the town.

Tourism
 San Juan Port - it was an active port during the early times but today, it serves as a hang out place for the people of Baroy and features Seaside Cuzina Bar and Restaurant. It is very crowded during December 1 when Tangub city opens their Christmas decorations and puts up fireworks which can be seen fully in the port. Every Saturday evening if the weather permits, a live acoustic band is played.
 Limuag Falls located at the part of Limug.
 Baroy Municipal Tourism Plaza - includes the Santo Niño Parish Church, Municipal hall, Rizal park, tennis and basketball court.
 Horizon Resort Splash away Waterpark, the most visited main attraction of the town

Healthcare
The town is served by the Lanao del Norte Provincial Hospital. The hospital also serves the nearby towns. The hospital is not yet developed fully.

There are also many health centers in the town. The main Health center is in poblacion near the municipal hall.

Education
Lanao del Norte National Comprehensive High School (which also serves the nearby towns) in Barangay Santo Niño Village and Diosdado Yap Sr. National High School in Barangay Dalama are the only secondary schools in the town.  There is also a private school which is known as Santo Niño Academy which was founded by Rev. Fr. John Patrick Meaney.

There are also few elementary schools. One is the Baroy Central Elementary School situated in Poblacion.

References

External links

 Baroy Profile at the DTI Cities and Municipalities Competitive Index
 [ Philippine Standard Geographic Code]
Philippine Census Information
Official site of Baroy
Local Governance Performance Management System

Municipalities of Lanao del Norte